Kato or Katō may refer to:

Places
Kato, Guyana, a village in Guyana
Katō, Hyōgo, a city in Hyōgo Prefecture, Japan
Katō District, Hokkaido, a district located in Tokachi Subprefecture, Hokkaido, Japan
Katowice, a city in Southern Poland, often abbreviated to Kato
Mankato, a city in Southern Minnesota, often abbreviated to Kato

Brands and enterprises
Kato Airline, a small airline based in Evenes, Norway
Kato Airport, an airport in Guyana
Kato Precision Railroad Models, a manufacturer of model railroad equipment

Fictional characters 
Kato (The Green Hornet), comic book character
Kato, the main antagonist in Astrid Lindgren's book Mio, My Son
Cato Fong (originally spelled "Kato"), character from the Pink Panther film series, see list of The Pink Panther characters

People
Kato (name), a given name and surname
Katō (surname), a Japanese surname

Nickname or stage name 
Kato (DJ), Danish DJ
Paul Diamond, Croatian professional wrestler Kato whose ring name is Kato
Kate Lambert, British British model and fashion designer known as Kato
Kato Kaelin, American actor
Kato Ottio, Papua New Guinean rugby league player
Kato Svanidze, first wife of Joseph Stalin

Other uses
Kato (instrument), a traditional musical instrument of Punjab
Kato people or Kato tribe, a group of Native American people in the United States
Kato language, the language of the Kato tribe
Kato technique, a method used for preparing faeces prior to examination for parasites
KATO (AM), a radio station (1230 AM) licensed to Safford, Arizona, United States
KATO-FM, a radio station (93.1 FM) licensed to New Ulm, Minnesota, United States
Kato (restaurant), a Michelin-starred restaurant in West Los Angeles, California

See also
Cato (disambiguation)
Kaito (disambiguation)